Saint-Raphaël is a commune in the Var department, Provence-Alpes-Côte d'Azur region, Southeastern France. In 2017, it had a population of 35,042.

Immediately to the west of Saint-Raphaël lies a larger and older town, Fréjus; together they form an urban agglomeration known as Var Estérel Méditerranée, which also encompasses the smaller communes of Les Adrets-de-l'Estérel, Puget-sur-Argens and Roquebrune-sur-Argens. In the second half of the 19th century, the township came under the influence of Mayor Felix Martin and writer Jean-Baptiste Alphonse Karr; owing to their efforts and its beneficial climate the commune developed into a seaside resort popular with artists, sportsmen and politicians.

It is the seat of the canton of Saint-Raphaël, also encompassing Fréjus and Les Adrets-de-l'Estérel, which is the economic and cultural centre of Eastern Var, within the arrondissement of Draguignan. Its inhabitants are called Raphaëlois in French generally, or Rafelencs in Provençal Occitan.

History
In 1799 Napoleon Bonaparte and his forces arrived by ship from Egypt, prior to his coup d'état in Paris, and landed at a fishing village that was the commune of Saint-Raphaël.

The coastal double-track rail link between Saint-Raphaël and Nice passes over a substantial viaduct constructed right on the shoreline at Anthéor. These tracks were of strategic importance to the Axis forces during World War II for supplying material to units in France.

There were three separate air raids made on this viaduct from England, between September 1943 and February 1944, involving a total of thirty-one Lancaster bombers operating some seven hundred miles from base. Aircraft of the second raid flew on to Rabat, and from the third raid on to Sardinia. One Lancaster from the first raid was lost, and a flight lieutenant bomb aimer on the third raid was killed by enemy fire, some of which came from ships at sea. All the raids failed in their objective and the rail link was not severed.

During World War II, on August 15, 1944, it was one of the sites of a beach landing in Operation Dragoon, the Allied invasion of southern France.

Population

Geography

Saint-Raphaël is located at the extreme eastern end of the Var, along the border with the adjacent département of Alpes-Maritimes, which occupies the far south-eastern corner of France at the frontier with Italy. The commune has a total of thirty-six kilometres of Mediterranean coastline, owing mainly to the many coves and creeks formed between the natural region of the Esterel Massif (Massif de l'Esterel) and the sea. This places it second only to Marseilles, with fifty-seven kilometres of coastline. The commune is 89.59 km2 in extent. It is almost completely urbanised in the west, but includes over 60 km2 of protected areas of natural forest and the Esterel mountains.

Saint-Raphaël has four large sandy beaches: one near the city centre, called the Veillat; one at Boulouris; one at Le Dramont, and the fourth at Agay. There are two smaller ones at Anthéor and Le Trayas.

Rivers
Saint-Raphaël is separated from Fréjus by the River Pédégal: fed by the Garonne, the Adrets-of-l'Esterel, Saint-Jean-de-Cannes and Saint-Jean-de-l'Esterel.

The River Agay flows from the mountains down through the village of that name, and is fed by the streams Cabre, Perthus and Grenouillet. The Grenouillet is the most important of these streams, having average flows of between 43 cu m/s in July and 1160 cu m/s in January.

The River Valescure, which is channelled through the Barrage des Crous (dam), discharges into the River Reyran at Fréjus.

Mountains

From east to west the commune has several mountain summits rising from the massif.

Situated almost entirely on the Esterel Massif, the commune sits on soil of red porphyr, which makes for very picturesque scenes along the coast where the soil and rocks are exposed on cliff faces and rocky shores.

Adjacent places
Immediately to the west and north-west of Saint-Raphaël lies the ancient town of Fréjus. To the north lie the hamlets of Saint-Jean-de-l'Esterel et Saint-Jean-de-Cannes, both within the Fréjus commune. To the extreme north-east, beyond Le Trayas, is the small resort of Miramar, lying within the commune of Théoule-sur-Mer. The Mediterranean Sea lies to the south of the whole Saint-Raphaël commune.

Climate
St. Raphaël is located on the Côte d'Azur and enjoys a Mediterranean climate with hot, dry summers and mild, humid winters. The Mistral wind occurs, although sometimes the town is sheltered from this by the Massif des Maures and the Esterel. It is perhaps more exposed to the Levant (strong, easterly, wet) or the Sirocco (very strong, southerly, hot) air flows, but these occur rarely.

Travel

Rail
The town's modern rail station is named Saint-Raphaël-Valescure and offers national, regional, and local train services:

 High-speed TGV and Ouigo trains - from Paris-Gare de Lyon (destination Nice)
 Night trains - from Paris-Gare d'Austerlitz (destination Nice)
 Lines 03 and 06 of TER Provence-Alpes-Côte d'Azur - from Marseille-Gare Saint-Charles (destination Nice)
 TER Provence-Alpes-Côte d'Azur - local stopping service to Cannes from Les Arcs

Air
International scheduled air passenger services are available at:

L'aéroport Nice Côte d'Azur: forty-five kilometres .

L'aéroport de Marseille Provence: .

Private, commercial and freight services are conducted at:

L'aéroport de Cannes - Mandelieu: twenty kilometres.

L'aéroport de La Môle - Saint-Tropez: thirty-four kilometres.

Bus
Saint-Raphaël is well served by bus routes, and has a busy bus station in the town centre.

Express service by LER PACA - Route 21: Aix-en-Provence to Nice.

Fast service (1 hour 15 mins) to Nice Airport by S.V.A. (Société Varoise d'Autocars)

Departement (County) services by SodeTrav (La Société Départementale des Transports du Var)
Routes 27, 28, 31, 53 and 104

Town services by AggloBus Fréjus/Saint-Raphael - Routes 1a, 3, 5, 6, 7, 8, 10.

Distances
Fréjus: 
Agay:  
Sainte-Maxime  
Draguignan: 
Saint-Tropez: 
Cannes: 
Brignoles:  
Nice:  
Toulon: 
Monte Carlo:  
Marseilles: 
Montpellier:  
Lyon:  
Perpignan:  
Paris:  
Bordeaux:

International relations

Saint-Raphaël is twinned with:
 Jermuk, Armenia
 Ghent, Belgium, since 1958
 Sankt Georgen im Schwarzwald, Germany, since 1972
 Tiberias, Israel, since 2007

Gallery

See also
Communes of the Var department
Île d'Or

References

External links

 
 www.ville-saintraphael.fr

Communes of Var (department)
Populated coastal places in France